Cnoc an Chuillinn (Irish for "hill of the steep slope"), at , is the sixth-highest peak in Ireland on the Arderin list and the seventh-highest peak in Ireland on the Vandeleur-Lynam list.  The name is sometimes incorrectly anglicised to Knockacullion, which is a name used for peaks and townlands in other parts of Ireland. Cnoc an Chuillinn is part of the MacGillycuddy's Reeks range in County Kerry.

Geography

Cnoc an Chuillinn lies in the eastern section of the MacGillycuddy's Reeks, Ireland's highest mountain range. It is at the start of a high ridge section that, moving eastwards,  includes Cnoc an Chuillinn East Top (a subsidiary summit of Cnoc an Chuillinn, but which is itself a Vandeleur-Lynam), Maolán Buí, Cnoc na Péiste, The Big Gun and finishes with Cruach Mhór. 

Between Cnoc an Chuillinn, and Cnoc an Chuillinn East Top, lies a major south-east spur to the less frequently climbed, Brassel Mountain, which descends steeply into the Black Valley below.  Brassel Mountain is regarded for its steep scrambling, and as an alternative access route to the eastern section of the main Reek's ridge, from more frequently used Hag's Glen options.

To the west of Cnon an Chiullinn is Cnoc na Toinne, and then the drop down to the col from which the Devil's Ladder can be descended into the Hag's Glen.

Cnoc an Chuillinn's name is often misspelt, including swapping the middle-"an" for "na", or using one "l" or one "n", or using the anglicised term of Knockacullion, as done in other parts of Ireland.

Cnoc an Chuillinn is the 316th-highest mountain in Britain and Ireland on the Simm classification. It is listed by the Scottish Mountaineering Club ("SMC") as one of 34 Furths, which is a mountain above  in elevation, and meets the other SMC criteria for a Munro (e.g. "sufficient separation"), but which is outside of (or furth) Scotland; which is why Cnoc an Chuillinn is sometimes referred to as one of the 13 Irish Munros.  

Cnoc an Chuillinn's prominence qualifies it to meet the Arderin classification, and the British Isles Simm and Hewitt classifications.

See also 

 Lists of mountains in Ireland
 List of mountains of the British Isles by height
 List of Furth mountains in the British Isles

References

External links
MountainViews: The Irish Mountain Website
MountainViews: Irish Online Mountain Database
The Database of British and Irish Hills , the largest database of British Isles mountains ("DoBIH")
Hill Bagging UK & Ireland, the searchable interface for the DoBIH
Ordnance Survey Ireland ("OSI") Online Map Viewer
Logainm: Placenames Database of Ireland

Mountains and hills of County Kerry
Furths
Mountains under 1000 metres